Mojo Records is a British record label that was formed in 1971 as a subsidiary of Polydor Records.

The label provided UK releases for some of the best contemporary US soul and R&B recordings. The label issued many soul singles from American artists including Tami Lynn, The Fascinations, Timmy Thomas, Doris Troy, Donnie Elbert, James Carr and Jamo Thomas.

See also 
 List of record labels

References

Sources
  
  This page lists Mojo's releases with reproductions of the disk labels.

External links
Mojo

Record labels established in 1971
British record labels
Soul music record labels